Mirai is a 3D creation and editing suite available originally from Nichimen Graphics Corporation, later from Winged Edge Technologies, and currently from Izware. The modeller uses the winged edge data structure, is written in Common Lisp, and traces its lineage to the S-Geometry software from Symbolics. It has been used primarily by game developers and high-end character animators—for example by Bay Raitt's facial morph targets for the Gollum character in The Lord of the Rings film trilogy.

See also
 N-World graphics software
 Wings 3D graphics software

References

External links
 
 The Two Towers: Face to Face with Gollum

3D graphics software
Common Lisp (programming language) software